The Arrows A20 was the car with which the Arrows Formula One team competed in the 1999 Formula One season.  

It was driven by former Jordan test driver Pedro de la Rosa, a Spanish débutant who brought considerable sponsorship from Repsol and Japan's Toranosuke Takagi, who moved from the defunct Tyrrell team. Mika Salo was due to stay with the team after a promising 1998 but was dropped just a week before the opening race.

Background and design 
The team was short of funds with the lack of a major sponsor (Danka's sponsorship having ended at the end of 1998) and the chassis was a mild update of the A19, which had not been too competitive itself. John Barnard had departed and it was left to Mike Coughlan to develop the car.

After failing to find an alternative supplier, engine builder Brian Hart again supplied in-house engines, but as in 1998, it became clear that his small resources were insufficient to compete in modern F1, and he left the team after an ownership dispute with Tom Walkinshaw.

Malik Ado Ibrahim buyout 
At the start of the year a colourful Nigerian prince, Malik Ado Ibrahim, bought a 25% shareholding in the team, and his T-Minus brand appeared on the cars for most of the year. However, he too could not provide sufficient funding. The idea behind the T-Minus brand was that companies and corporations would purchase the rights to use the name and they would be permitted to use the brand to promote their products. Malik stated that he planned to use the brand in conjunction with Lamborghini but a deal never pulled through. An Arrows employee of the time stated 'The T-Minus brand has brought in absolutely no money over the year' and carried on stating 'It was simply a dream in the Prince's head and nothing materialised.' Investment company Morgan Grenfell also bought into Arrows, taking a 50% controlling interest in the team.

Racing history 
The year proved to be a disaster, as the cars were slow and unreliable, and the team ended up battling with Minardi at the back of the grid. Its only competitive showing came in the opening race of the season at Melbourne, where de la Rosa finished sixth for a point on his début, with Takagi one place back in seventh. Only this point, and newcomer BAR's poor finishing record, kept Arrows from finishing last in the Constructors' standings. De La Rosa stated that the engine, not the chassis was the problem, commenting favorably on the handling of the car.

While de la Rosa proved promising, Takagi struggled with communication issues as he could not speak English at the time and left at the end of the season; he was replaced for 2000 by Jos Verstappen.

Aftermath 
The A20 was extensively refitted in preparation for the 2000 season which saw the team use Supertec engines. De La Rosa and Tom Coronel put in a lot of mileage and posted competitive times. Mark Webber had his first test in a Formula One car aboard an A20 in November 1999, running the Supertec engine and new gearbox. He later said in his autobiography that the A20 was an above average car.

The A20 eventually formed the basis of the AX3 3-seater car which Arrows introduced in 2001, using a modified chassis and the same Hart engine. Two examples were built.

Complete Formula One results
(key) (results in bold indicate pole position)

Notes

References
AUTOCOURSE 1999-2000, Henry, Alan (ed.), Hazleton Publishing Ltd. (1999) 

Arrows Formula One cars
1999 Formula One season cars